The Understanding may refer to:

 The Understanding (Memphis Bleek album), 2000
 The Understanding (Röyksopp album), 2005